Giampaolo Crepaldi (born 29 September 1947) is the current archbishop-bishop of Trieste since his installation on 4 October 2009. He had previously served as secretary of the Pontifical Council for Justice and Peace.

Early life and ordination
Crepaldi was born in Pettorazza Grimani, province of Rovigo. He was ordained priest on 17 July 1971 in the parish of Villadose. He has done his pastoral ministry as a curate in the parish of Villanova del Ghebbo and Castelmassa.

Professor
In 1975 he obtained his degree in philosophy from the Faculty of Letters and Philosophy at the State University of Bologna and in 1977 the Diploma of Specialization in Philosophy at the University of Padua. 
In 1981 he obtained a doctorate in theology at the Pontifical Urban University and, in 1989, a Licentiate in Canon Law at the Pontifical Lateran University. He was Professor of Pastoral Company at the Pontifical Lateran University.

Pastoral work
In 1977 he received the post of Episcopal Delegate for the Pastoral Care and Social Director of the Diocesan Center for Vocational Training and in 1985 he was appointed parish priest of Cambio. In 1986, he served as perform his ministry at the Conference of Catholic Bishops as a Director of the Episcopal Social Problems and Work.

Curial duties
In 1994 he entered the service of the Holy See has held the post of Under-Secretary of the Pontifical Council for Justice and Peace and, on 3 March 2001, was appointed Secretary and Titular Bishop of Bisarcio. He is also currently Member of the Pontifical Council for the Pastoral Care of Migrants and Itinerant People.

Catholic social teaching
In 2003, he founded the International Center "Cardinal Van Thuan" on the Social Doctrine of the Church, of which he is President. He has published several books mainly on themes of social doctrine of the ChurchIn 2003 she founded the International Center "Cardinal Van Thuan" on the Social Doctrine of the Church, of which he is President.

Bishop
He was consecrated bishop by John Paul II on 19 March 2001.  Bishop Crepaldi was appointed Bishop of Trieste with the personal title of Archbishop by Pope Benedict XVI on 4 July 2009. He was installed in Trieste on 4 October 2009. Mario Toso was appointed as Secretary of the Pontifical Council for Justice and Peace filling the vacancy left by Archbishop Crepaldi on 22 October 2009.

Views

Genetically modified foods
Archbishop Giampaolo Crepaldi has said that African farmers should be able to use new biotechnology, including genetically modified organisms, to help lift their continent out of poverty.

References

External links

Living people
1947 births
Pontifical Lateran University alumni
Pontifical Council for Justice and Peace
20th-century Roman Catholics
21st-century Roman Catholics
Bishops in Friuli-Venezia Giulia